The 1999–2000 Serie A (known as the Serie A TIM for sponsorship reasons) was the 98th season of top-tier Italian football, the 68th in a round-robin tournament. It was contested by 18 teams.

By late March, Juventus topped the table by nine points over Lazio with only eight games remaining, but they lost to Milan, to Lazio at the Stadio delle Alpi, and to Hellas Verona, with Lazio only dropping two points, against Fiorentina. Lazio won the title on the final day of the season when Juventus lost their match against Perugia 1–0 on an almost flooded pitch, while Lazio comfortably beat Reggina 3–0 at home at the Stadio Olimpico.

Teams
Hellas Verona, Torino, Lecce and Reggina had been promoted from Serie B.

Personnels and Sponsoring

Number of teams by region

League table

Results

UEFA Champions League qualification

Internazionale qualified to 2000–01 UEFA Champions League's third qualifying round, while Parma qualified to the 2000–01 UEFA Cup first round.

Top goalscorers

References and sources
Almanacco Illustrato del Calcio – La Storia 1898-2004, Panini Edizioni, Modena, September 2005

Footnotes

External links

 :it:Classifica calcio Serie A italiana 2000 – Italian version with pictures and info.
  – All results on RSSSF Website.
 1999/2000 Serie A Squads – (www.footballsquads.com)

Serie A seasons
Italy
1999–2000 in Italian football leagues